Gehenna: Where Death Lives is a 2016 horror film written and directed by Hiroshi Katagiri. An international co-production of the United States and Japan, the film stars Justin Gordon, Eva Swan, Simon Phillips, Doug Jones, Lance Henriksen, and Patrick Gorman. It was acquired by Uncork'd Entertainment in 2018 and was released on May 4, 2018. An early screening was held at Saipan Regal Cinemas on June 30, 2018.

Plot 
The film follows a group of five people exploring the remote island of Saipan, while scouting for a new resort location, who all become trapped in a hidden WWII bunker. The team encounter oddly dressed mummified bodies, a living corpse, and a Japanese man still in war uniform. With the help of a diary written in Japanese they begin to piece together the curse placed on the area, while attempting to survive supernatural and psychological attacks.

Cast 
 Doug Jones as Creepy Old Man
 Lance Henriksen as Morgan
 Patrick Gorman as Don Rodrigogiobb
 Simon Phillips as Alan
 Sean Sprawling as Pepe
 Eva Swan as Paulina
 Katherine Wallace as Claire
 Justin Gordon as Tyler
 Matthew Edward Hegstrom as Dave

Production and release 
Gehenna: Where Death Lives is Katagiri's debut directorial feature. Filming was completed in Los Angeles, California and Saipan and Tinian in 2015, and traditional special-effects makeup was used to create all of the gory scenes at Spectral Motion in Glendale, California.

It was the first feature film shot for a significant part in Saipan and Tinian, and was hailed as such as a significant contribution to the cinema of Northern Mariana Islands. Although the production and the directors were not local, the crew, extras, and some actors were from Saipan, and the Commonwealth of Northern Mariana Islands supported the production, which was also helped by local citizens who participated in its crowdfunding. Locals hoped that the movie, as "the first film of its kind not only to be shot on Saipan but also for the plot to take place here," may encourage "Marianas-bred filmmakers" to start more ambitious local projects.

The film premiered at the Shriekfest Film Festival in Los Angeles in October 2016. It premiered in the United Kingdom at Bram Stoker International Film Festival on October 27, 2016, and in Australia at A Night of Horror Film Festival on November 24, 2016. It also screened at New York City International Film Festival and Philadelphia Asian American Film Festival in 2016. In 2017, it screened at the Indie Horror Film Festival in Chicago, where it won Best Cinematography for a Feature Film.

In 2018, the film was acquired by Uncork'd Entertainment. A limited US theatrical and VOD release was announced for May 4, 2018. An Early Screening of the movie will be at Saipan's Regal Cinemas starting June 30, 2018.

Reception

Critical reception

On review aggregator website Rotten Tomatoes, the film holds an approval rating of 50%, based on 10 reviews, and an average rating of 5.3/10.

Noel Murray from the Los Angeles Times wrote, "Gehenna features impressive gore effects, but the plot's an uninspired hodgepodge of dozens of other "haunted structure" pictures, set at a plodding pace, in a gray, dim location. It peaks in its first five minutes. The remaining 100 go nowhere, slowly." Dennis Harvey from Variety stated that the film's premise showed promise, and the performances were competent; but was undone by its underdeveloped script, and lack of actual scares.

Norman Gidney from Film Threat wrote that, while the film is "Not perfect, not by a longshot," it is "too much fun not to see through to the end."

Awards and nominations 
In 2017, Gehenna: Where Death Lives won Best Cinematography for a Feature Film at the Indie Horror Film Festival in Chicago.

See also 
 Gehenna – a historic valley surrounding Ancient Jerusalem, sometimes associated with a concept of divine punishment
 Japanese horror

References

External links 
 
 
 
 
 

2016 films
2016 horror films
American supernatural horror films
Japanese supernatural horror films
Films set in the Northern Mariana Islands
Films shot in the Northern Mariana Islands
Crowdfunded films
2010s English-language films
2010s American films
2010s Japanese films
Films set in bunkers